Muir Elementary School may refer to the following:
Muir Elementary School in Antioch, California
John Muir Elementary School in Berkeley, California
John Muir Elementary School in Cupertino, California
Muir Elementary School in Fresno, California
John Muir Elementary School in Glendale, California
John Muir Elementary School in Lodi, California
John Muir Elementary School in Martinez, California
John Muir Elementary School in Merced, California
John Muir Elementary School in Modesto, California
John Muir Elementary School in San Bruno, California
John Muir Elementary School in San Francisco, California
John Muir Fundamental Elementary School in Santa Ana, California
John Muir Elementary School in Santa Monica, California
John Muir Elementary School in Hoffman Estates, Illinois
John Muir Elementary School in Parma, Ohio
John Muir Elementary School in Ashland, Oregon
Nellie Muir Elementary School in Woodburn, Oregon
Leo J. Muir Elementary School in Bountiful, Utah
Muir Elementary School in Madison, Wisconsin
Muir Elementary School in Portage, Wisconsin

References